Elzan Bibić (born 8 January 1999) is a Serbian middle- and long-distance runner. He won the bronze medal in the 1500 metres at the 2019 European Under-23 Championships.

Bibić was the 3000 metres 2016 European youth champion and won a bronze for the men's junior race at the 2018 European Cross Country Championships. He earned several Serbian national titles both out and indoors (1500 m and 3000 m).

Bibić won the bronze medal in the event at the 2023 European Indoor Championships.

Running career
Bibić initially played soccer before training as a distance runner. He won the boys' 3000-meter race at the 2015 European Youth Summer Olympic Festival with a time of 8:50.10.

On July 7, 2017, he won a 3000-meter race at a track meet in Zenica, after which he felt knee pain. Shortly afterwards he was diagnosed with damaged ligaments in his knee, his first serious injury.

On September 4, 2018, Bibić ran his then personal best of 3:37.79 (and still reigning Serbian U20 national record) in the men's 1500 meters at the Hanžeković Memorial meet in Zagreb, finishing in last place among a deep international field led by first place finisher Elijah Manangoi.

In the 2022 World Athletics Indoor Championships in Belgrade he finished 6th in the Heat 2 of 3000 meter race with the time of 7:52.78 and did not progress to the finals.

Personal life
Bibić was born in Karajukića Bunari, known as the "Siberia" of Serbia due to extremely cold temperatures which are frequently recorded there. Karajukića Bunari is above 1,000 meters in altitude, as it is located on a plateau called Pešter. Bibić went to a medical trade school in his hometown, Novi Pazar. His parents were athletes growing up. His father Murat played soccer and his mother Fatima played volleyball.

International competitions

Personal bests
 800 metres – 1:50.31 (Ćuprija 2021)
 1500 metres – 3:35.07 (Zagreb 2020)
 1500 metres indoor – 3:37.84 (Belgrade 2022) 
 One mile indoor – 3:55.90 (Ostrava 2023) 
 3000 metres – 7:39.45 (Rovereto 2021) 
 3000 metres indoor – 7:39.96 (Toruń 2022) 
 5000 metres – 13:24.42 (Huelva 2022)

References

1999 births
Living people
Serbian male middle-distance runners
Serbian male long-distance runners
Bosniaks of Serbia
Athletes (track and field) at the 2018 Mediterranean Games
Athletes (track and field) at the 2022 Mediterranean Games
Mediterranean Games competitors for Serbia
21st-century Serbian people